Jones Glacier is a channel glacier,  wide and  long, flowing north from the continental ice to the coast close east of Krause Point. It was delineated from aerial photographs taken by U.S. Navy Operation Highjump, 1946–47, and was named by the Advisory Committee on Antarctic Names for Ensign Teddy E. Jones, U.S. Navy Reserve, a photo interpreter with the Naval Photographic Interpretation Center, who served as recorder and assistant with the U.S. Navy Operation Windmill parties which established astronomical control stations along Wilhelm II Coast, Knox Coast and Budd Coast in 1947–48.

See also
 List of glaciers in the Antarctic
 Glaciology

References

Glaciers of Kaiser Wilhelm II Land